The Royal Jordanian Air Force (RJAF) is the aerial warfare branch of the Jordanian Armed Forces.

History

Early days

Jordan gained independence in 1946, but its first air bases had been set up in 1931 by the Royal Air Force. By 1948, Jordan began to develop a small air arm which came to be known as the Arab Legion Air Force (ALAF).  The Royal Air Force assisted in training this small air arm and provided equipment. The ALAF's primary fighter was the de Havilland Vampire and a Vickers VC.1 Viking was operated as a VIP aircraft for use by the King of Jordan. By 1955 King Hussein realized the need for Jordan to have a more modern air force, and on 25 September 1955 the RJAF was established.  By 1958 the Royal Air Force had left Jordan and the RJAF had taken control of the airfields in the country.

1960s
In 1967, in the Six-Day War, the Israeli Air Force relentlessly attacked Jordan's Air Force and air bases. Jordan lost its entire strength of 28 aircraft and their Air Force was reduced to zero. Israel was victorious in all engagements over Israeli territory.

1970s

In the 1970s the RJAF was modernised. Lockheed F-104 Starfighters were acquired from the United States following heavy losses in the Six-Day War. However, the Starfighter proved superfluous and several were given to the Pakistan Air Force with the last unit withdrawn from service in 1977 leaving a fighter gap that would not be filled until the arrival of the Dassault Mirage F1 in 1981. The RJAF also acquired Northrop F-5 Tigers via Iran during the reign of the Shah who procured them from the United States. Cessna T-37 Tweets were also acquired for the training role.  In 1975, the RJAF gave its fleet of 31 Hawker Hunters to the Sultan of Oman's Air Force, having failed in their efforts to sell them to Rhodesia or Honduras. The Hunters were delivered to SOAF Thumrait between May and June 1975.

1980s

Following peace between Egypt and Israel in 1979, the RJAF began to modernize its fleet once again.  The first part of this program was the procurement of the Dassault Mirage F1 which became the RJAF's frontline fighter supported by generous aid from wealthy oil-rich Arab states. The Mirage F1 was selected over the General Dynamics F-16/79 (an F-16A powered by the GE J79 turbojet series as opposed to the Pratt & Whitney F100, which had 25% more power in afterburn) while also acquiring the Northrop F-5 to complement the Mirage F1CJ/EJ in the process.

In the 1980s, the RJAF supported Saddam Hussein and the Iraqi regime during the Iran-Iraq War, committing their aircraft for combat training alongside Iraqi aircraft squadrons with one joint aircraft squadron.  It remains unknown whether RJAF pilots took part in combat with Iran, although this seems unlikely. During the 1991 Gulf War, Jordan declared political support for the Iraqi regime, but the RJAF was never committed to combat in that war. The RJAF provided instruction for Iraqi pilots who also operated the similar Mirage F1.

Some six Lockheed C-130H Hercules entered RJAF service and remain critical in supporting Jordan's peacekeeping efforts. In 1987 the RJAF received CASA C-101s to replace the T-37 in the training role.

1991 Persian Gulf War and the 1990s
Due to economics ties between Jordan and Iraq, the fallout of Iraq meant that the RJAF was impacted upon but contrary to some reports, it did not lose its operational tempo and was not forced to cannibalize aircraft for shortages of spare parts. Despite this, the RJAF had to rationalise its existing resources due to a temporary downfall in spare parts and supplies. However, economic difficulties forced the RJAF to seek upgrades rather than the purchase of new equipment originally planned.

Modernization schemes continued with seven F-5Es sold to Singapore and some funding used to upgrade most of the remaining others with the AN/APG-67 radar (found on the aborted Northrop F-20 Tigershark, once an aircraft under evaluation by the RJAF), modern fire control systems, and within visual range (WVR) AAMs, thus putting the F-5 on par with more modern aircraft in terms of electronics. Despite this, the F-5s lack a BVR combat capability.

Modern era

Two light CASA C-295s have been procured and procurement is likely to continue of the type. RJAF also received smaller numbers of the Antonov An-32 from Ukraine for STOL operations for Royal Special Forces, although the status of the Jordanian An-32s is uncertain. One Lockheed C-130 Hercules was received in March 1997. In 2006 two Ilyushin Il-76MF freighters were purchased from Russia. In 2011 RJAF announced the intention to turn 2 of the CASA/IPTN CN-235 transport aircraft into small aerial gunships.

The Jordanian Special Operations Aviation Brigade has been using Sikorsky UH-60L Blackhawk and MD Helicopters MD-530F helicopters for special operations and border security. Two squadrons of ex-US Army AH-1F Cobra gunships were delivered in the late 1990s/early 2000s. Some have been sold to Pakistan and AH-1Fs will be replaced by new AH-6I attack helicopters. After signing the MDAP 18 surplus Bell UH-1H helicopters were delivered in 1994, followed by another 18 in 1996. Two C-130B Hercules transport aircraft and 16 UH-1H helicopters have been delivered to the Iraqi Air Force. Three C-130E will be received from the US in exchange. Currently two squadrons of UH-1Hs and one of AS332 Super Pumas support Army operations.

Between November 2015 and 3 March 2016, 8 UH-60A Black Hawks were delivered to Jordan from the United States under a no-cost lease arrangement. The delivery of 8 newly built UH-60M Black Hawks is expected in 2017 as part of a United States grant totaling US$200 million, with Sikorsky being contracted to the U.S. Army to build them.

Jordan assist Air forces in the Middle East, training Bahraini pilots and assisting Iraq. There is also a close cooperation with the USAF. The current commander of the Royal Jordan Air Force is Major General Zaid Naqrash.

Operations in Syria 2014–2015

On the morning of 16 April 2014, Jordanian air force fighter jets destroyed an undetermined number of vehicles trying to enter into Jordan by crossing the border from war-torn Syria during the Syrian Civil War.

On 23 September 2014, Jordanian air force aircraft joined in US-led air strikes against terrorist targets in Syria that later became known as Operation Inherent Resolve.

On 24 December 2014, an RJAF F-16 crashed near Raqqa, Syria, and its pilot, Flight Lieutenant Moaz Youssef al-Kasasbeh, was captured by ISIS militants. On 30 December 2014, a member of the Jordanian parliament, Rula al-Hroob, told America's National Public Radio that the RJAF had suspended military operations over Syria in order to help secure al-Kasasbeh's release. An attempt by US special operations to rescue al-Kasasbeh from Raqqa on 1 January 2015 failed when their helicopters were driven off by heavy enemy fire.

Following unsuccessful negotiations about a prisoner exchange, on 3 February 2015 it was reported that ISIS had murdered al-Kasasbeh by burning him alive, something that was done in early January but not revealed.

On 5 February 2015, the RJAF resumed operations against ISIS targets. The whole daily target list was handed over to 20 Jordanian F-16s.

In February 2015 the US resupplied Jordan with munitions to be used in airstrikes against ISIS, including JDAM precision bombs. 
In the summer of 2015 Israel transferred 16 Bell AH-1E/F Cobras (4–6 to be used as spares) to be used by RJAF in the "border patrol" role, this is counter-insurgency role and in operations against terrorist State forces.

On 7 November 2015, The New York Times claimed that the RJAF had quietly suspended operations against targets in Syria, the last attack being in August, and instead diverted its aircraft to support Saudi-led operations against Houthi rebels in Yemen. This claim was contested by the Jordanian embassy in Washington, which told the paper that Jordan continued to conduct airstrikes on terrorist State targets.

Mission
Protect And Defend Sovereignty And The Integrity Of The Hashemite Kingdom Of Jordan.

 Precision Engagement
The essence lies in the ability to apply selective force against specific targets because the nature and variety of future contingencies demand both precise and reliable use of military power with minimal risk and collateral damage.

 Information Superiority
The ability of joint force commanders to keep pace with information and incorporate it into a campaign plan is crucial.

 Agile Combat Support
Deployment and sustainment are keys to successful operations and cannot be separated. Agile combat support applies to all forces, from those permanently based to contingency buildups to expeditionary forces.

 Core Values
The Air Force bases these core competencies and distinctive capabilities on a shared commitment to three values: Integrity first, Service before self, and Excellence in all we do.

 The Secondary Tasks
 To support Land Forces in any armed conflict with any external power.
 To support security forces in their tasks of maintaining internal security, anti smuggling operations and border security operations.
 Additional Tasks
 Air lift operations.
 Search and rescue.
 Medical evacuation.
 Relief operations.
 Evacuation of citizens from areas of conflict.

Despite the limited funds and resources, Jordan has become actively involved in peace keeping operations, In 1994 the Jordanian Air Force participated in the airlifting operations to support the Jordanian troops serving with the United Nations in maintaining and preserving peace and resolving local disputes.

RJAF achieved more than 200 flying hours in support of the Jordanian Armed Forces participating in peace keeping operations in Four ( 4 ) Continents.

Organization
The Royal Jordanian Air Force has a strength of 14,000 active personnel. It contains six major airbases in addition to nineteen air squadrons, fourteen I-Hawk Batteries, and two training schools (a fighter aviation training school and a school of air combat). The Royal Jordanian Air Force Headquarters is at King Abdullah I Airbase in Amman.

Squadrons
No. 1 Squadron RJAF – the Squadron was formed in 1958 with the Hawker Hunter and later equipped with F5s, the Mirage F1, and now the General Dynamics/Lockheed F-16. It has been based in Amman, Mafraq and now Azraq, with short periods at H5, and Habbaniya (Iraq).
No. 2 Squadron RJAF – was first formed in 1958 with de Havilland Vampires then with Hunters and later in 1974 with F5As and Bs as an advanced training squadron at King Hussein Air Base, Mafraq. It subsequently flew from Amman and Mafraq as a fighter squadron, then flew again from Mafraq, renamed in 1978 as the King Hussein Air College, with the CASA C-101 as the advanced jet trainer. It is now at MSAB equipped with the F-16.
No. 3 Squadron RJAF – was formed in 1959 and was a mixture of fixed-wing and helicopter until February 1973 when a helicopter squadron was formed. Its aircraft have included the de Havilland Dove; Heron; Ambassador; C47; C119; Brittan Norman Islander; CASA 212 and 235, with a helicopter flight of Westland Whirlwind; Widgeon; Scout and Alouette III. The Squadron belongs to the Air Lift Wing and is based at KAAB, Amman (Amman Civil Airport). It is now equipped with the Lockheed C-130 Hercules and CASA 295.

Royal Jordanian Air Defence
Royal Jordanian air defense is part of the Royal Jordanian Air Force is equipped with Surface-to-Air missiles and Anti-Aircraft guns and Radar stations, as well as modern Electronic Warfare center and electronic countermeasure which is linked to command and control (C2) centers.
Jordan provided with an integrated, real-time air picture across multiple command centers and many remote sites to better protect the country's airspace. The system, known as Omnyx™, will combine sensor, voice and data communications to provide interoperability throughout the Royal Jordanian Air Force and other elements of Jordan's armed forces. With input from radars and other data links, the system will assist in detecting incoming air traffic and also provide the capabilities needed for airspace management, air sovereignty and air defense missions.
RJAF C2 and EW Capability
Omnyx™ System enabling Jordanian Air Force to track and identify aircraft, evaluate any threats, initiate or monitor airborne engagements and enhance situational awareness of Jordanian airspace at all times.
Jordan have a C4ISR subsystem capable of serving multiple internal services and agencies within Jordan and An Air Defense subsystem capable of early warning of air attack and real-time Command and Control (C2) of national air defense forces.
RADIANT C4I National EW network, connecting regional control centers, ground radars and AD assets.
Jordan has the ability to detect cruise missiles, aircraft and unmanned drones at long distances through the project linking five U.S. 3D radars (1 FPS-117, 4 TPS-77), QAIA Radar and Gap-filler radars with ADSI (Air Defence System Integrator), Airbases and all Fire Units to build air defence umbrella (IADS).
Air Surveillance Radars
 1 AN/FPS-117 3D Radar  
 4 AN/TPS-77 3D Radar
 5 AN/TPS-63 Tactical 2D Radar
 5 Marconi S711 Radar (Upgraded by AMS UK in 2005)
 Gap-filler & Border Surveillance radars
AA Gun System
 60 Flakpanzer Gepard 
 48 ZSU-23-4 Shilka 
 181 M163 Vulcan (81 VADS transferred from Belgium to Jordan in 2005)
Short-Range Tactical SAM System
 50 SA-13 Strela-10
 SA-22 Pantsir-S1E
Medium & Long Range Air Defence
 10 MIM-23 Hawk PIP III with MIM-23E Missiles (upgraded in 2016) 
 In the period from 2004 to 2012 the components of 8 Hawk Phase III batteries were acquired gradually and some old Hawk batteries were modernized to Phase III, Jordan received more than 400 MEI-23E missiles in 2014 and 2016. Many units are phased out and only 10 modernized units remain in service as of 2020.
 3 MIM-104 Patriot unknown type Batteries (12 launchers)
 Jordan plans to deploy further four Patriot air defense batteries

Current inventory

Retired aircraft 
Previous notable aircraft operated by Jordan consisted of the de Havilland Dove, F-104 Starfighter, Dassault Mirage F1, Cessna T-37, Boeing 727, Gulfstream III, An-12 Cub, Bulldog 125, CASA C-235, Piper PA-44, Alouette III, Aérospatiale Gazelle and the Sikorsky S-76

Future developments

The Royal Jordanian Air Force has received new aircraft, and other types of use have been withdrawn and put up for sale. On 24 July 2019, The Royal Jordanian Air Force Commander, Major General Yousef Huneiti, was appointed to a senior position as chairman of the Joint Chiefs of Staff of the Jordanian Armed Forces. The current Commander of the Royal Jordanian Air Force is brigadier general. Pilot Zaid Al-Najrish, who aims to continue in the footsteps of his predecessor in terms of more professionalism in the Royal Jordanian Air Force.

On the 3rd of March 2020, It was announced that instead of upgrading, Royal Jordanian Air Force is now looking to buy the latest F-16 Block 70/72 model to replace its current fleet of older F-16s. As early as September 2017, the Royal Jordanian Air Force was working with the U.S. Air Force Air Force Life Cycle Management Center (AFLCMC), based at Wright Patterson Air Force Base, Ohio, to begin the Viper Block-70 operational upgrade program. This study is still under way, but it is unclear whether, and when, it will apply where necessary congressional approvals are needed to sell these possibilities to Jordan.

It was announced on the 28th of July 2021, that F-16 MLU fighter levels 5 and 6.5, which is approximately equivalent to F-16C/D Block 50/52 and F-16C/D Block 50/52 + the except of the radar armed with GBU, JDAM bombs, AAM and ASM missiles, and targeting and reconnaissance pods, a video was released by the Ministry of Defense showing Jordanian pilots training in the newly upgraded F-16s.

With addition to the latest upgrade of F-16 fighters to MLU level, it was announced on 14 November 2021, that the latest F-16 MLU 6.5 were upgraded with fighter aircraft painted with radar-absorbent paint GLASS V PAINT.

On the 3rd of February 2022, The State Department has made a determination approving a possible Foreign Military Sale to the Hashemite Kingdom of Jordan of F-16 C/D Block 70 aircraft and related equipment for an estimated cost of $4.21 billion. The Defense Security Cooperation Agency delivered the required certification notifying Congress of this possible sale that day. It is believed that Jordan aims to acquire 12 C models, and four D models, as well as 21 F100 engines (providing five spare engines) and associated weapon and system packages.

Personnel

Commanders 

The Royal Jordanian Air Force is headed by the Commander. The chiefs of the RJAF are as follows:

 1956–1962 Major (Colonel) Ibrahim Osman
 1962 Major Jereis Musharbash
 1962 Major Sahal Hamzeh
 1962–1970 Major (Major-General) Saleh El Kurdi
 1971–1973 Brigadier Walid Sharafuddin
 1973–1976 Brigadier Abboud Salem Hassan
 1976–1980 unknown
 1980–1982 Brigadier (Major-General) Tayseer Zarour
 1983–1993 Brigadier (Lieutenant-General) Ihsan Shurdom
 1993–1994 Brigadier (Major-General) Awni Bilal
 1994–1995 Brigadier (Major-General) Mohammed El Qudah
 1995–1999 Brigadier (Major-General) Mohammed Khair Ababneh
 1999–2002 Brigadier (Major-General) So'oud Nuseirat
 2002–2004 Brigadier (Major-General) His Royal Highness Prince Faisal bin Hussein
 2004–2006 Brigadier (Major-General) Hussein Al Biss
 2006–2010 Brigadier (Major-General) Hussein Shodash
 2010–2013 Brigadier (Major-General) Malek Al-Habashneh
 2013–2016 Brigadier (Major-General) Mansour Al-Jbour
 2016–2019 Brigadier (Major-General) Yousef Huneiti
 2019–2021 Brigadier (Major-General) Zaid Naqrash
 2021–Present Brigadier (Major-General) Mohammad Hyasat

Notable persons
Amer Khammash, the first recognized Jordanian pilot and received his pilot training in Middle Wallop in the United Kingdom in 1949, and received his wings in 1950 from the Late Founder of Jordan, King Abdullah I bin Al-Hussein.
Muath al-Kasasbeh, Royal Jordanian Air Force pilot captured, held hostage, and burned alive by the Terrorist group.

See also
List of air forces
List of Lockheed F-104 Starfighter operators

References

 Griffin, David J., 60 Years of the Hawker Hunter, 1951 to 2011

External links

Official Site of the Royal Jordanian Air Force
Royal Jordanian Airforce courtesy of Scramble.nl
Royal Jordanian Air Force F-16s

 
Jordanian Air Force
Air Force
Air
Air Force